Abdelhameed Amarriis a Sudanese football striker. He currently plays for Khartoum.

Amarri also played for the Sudan national team. In the 2007 Cecafa Cup, he helped the squad win the tournament and was named the top scorer.

Honours

Club 
 Al-Merrikh SC
 Sudan Premier League:2008
 Sudan Cup: 2005, 2006, 2007, 2008
 Sudan national football team
 CECAFA: 2007

Internationalgoals

External links 

 
 

1984 births
Living people
Sudanese footballers
Sudan international footballers
Association football midfielders
2008 Africa Cup of Nations players
Al-Merrikh SC players